Harold Webster may refer to:

H. T. Webster (1885–1952), American cartoonist
Harold Webster (athlete) (1895–1958), Canadian athlete
Harold Webster (cricketer) (1889–1949), cricketer for South Australia

See also
Harry Webster (1917–2007), British engineer